Tong Jinquan (born 1954) is a Chinese businessman, chairman of Summit Property Development, a Chinese real estate developer.

Early life
Tong was born in Shaoxing, Zhejiang Province, China in 1954, the seventh of nine children of parents who ran a grocery store.

Career
Tong started work in 1975, at a local table tennis equipment factory. By 1983, Tong had become general manager at another sporting goods company. In 1992, Tong founded Summit Property Development in Shanghai, China.

Tong's company, Summit, has invested more than $1 billion in a commercial complex in Chengdu. He has significant stakes in three Singapore REITs: Viva Industrial, Cambridge Industrial, Sabana Shari'ah Compliant Industrial Trust, and Suntec. According to Forbes, Tong has a net worth of $4.7 billion, as of January 2015.

Personal life
Tong is married with two children and lives in Shanghai.

References 

1954 births
Living people
Billionaires from Zhejiang
Businesspeople from Shaoxing